Donovans may refer to:

 Donovans, Newfoundland and Labrador, Canada, a former village now within the borders of the town of Paradise, Newfoundland and Labrador
 Donovans, South Australia, a locality in Australia
 The Donovans, an Australian Aboriginal country band

See also

 Donovan (disambiguation)